Leyesaurus is an extinct genus of massospondylid sauropodomorph dinosaur known from the San Juan Province, northwestern Argentina.

Description 

Leyesaurus is known from the holotype PVSJ 706, a nearly complete skull with articulated mandible and some postcranial remains (vertebral column, scapular and pelvic girdles and hindlimb). It was collected from the uppermost part of the Quebrada del Barro Formation of the Marayes-El Carrizal Basin, dating to the Lower Jurassic (based on the similarities between Leyesaurus and Lower Jurassic sauropodomorphs, like Massospondylus and Adeopapposaurus). Leyesaurus was found near the locality Balde de Leyes, in the Caucete Department of San Juan Province. Within Massospondylidae, Leyesaurus was found to be most closely related to Adeopapposaurus.

Etymology 
Leyesaurus was first named by Cecilia Apaldetti, Ricardo N. Martinez, Oscar A. Alcober and Diego Pol in 2011 and the type species is Leyesaurus marayensis. The generic name honors the Leyes family, inhabitants of the small town Balde de Leyes, who discovered the holotype and notified the paleontologists of the San Juan Museum, and saurus, Greek for "lizard". The specific name refers to the Marayes-El Carrizal Basin, where the holotype was discovered.

Phylogeny 
The following cladogram shows the position of Leyesaurus within Massopoda, according to Oliver W. M. Rauhut and colleagues, 2020:

References 

Massospondylidae
Dinosaur genera
Early Jurassic dinosaurs of South America
Jurassic Argentina
Fossils of Argentina
Geology of San Juan Province, Argentina
Fossil taxa described in 2011